TV50 was a series of special events throughout 2012, celebrating the 50th anniversary of the launch of RTÉ Television, then known as Telefís Éireann, on 31 December 1961.

Launch
TV50 was officially launched on 26 December 2011 when a pre-launch placeholder website went online at RTÉ. The full TV50 site went live at noon on New Year's Eve 2011. The broadcaster intended TV50 to be a year-long celebration. The festivities saw as many as twenty archive programmes launched each month on RTÉ Player.

Controversy
RTÉ offended viewers by depicting a dog having its legs tied together and being tossed overboard into the sea off the coast of County Donegal as part of its TV50 celebrations in a broadcast on 3 January 2012.

List of TV50 programmes
The following is a list of programmes broadcast under the TV50 label.

Associated events

Books
Window and Mirror: RTÉ Television 1961–2011

Nationwide search
There was a nationwide search initiated by RTÉ.

Doc on the Box
RTÉ described this as "a forward-looking initiative designed to encourage a fresh, emerging voice in video documentary direction and production". However, it was only open to those over the age of eighteen years and with experience.

See also
 2012 in Irish television

References

External links
 TV50 at RTÉ.ie

2011 in Irish television
2012 in Irish television
RTÉ controversies
RTÉ history
RTÉ Television